Stanislav Jasečko (born 5 December 1972) is a Slovak former professional ice hockey defenceman.

During his career, Jasečko played in the Czech Extraliga for HC České Budějovice, HC Vitkovice Steel and HC Lasselsberger Plzeň, the Swedish Elitserien for HV71, the Finnish SM-liiga for Porin Ässät, the Russian Superleague for Neftekhimik Nizhnekamsk and the International Hockey League for the Grand Rapids Griffins. He also played for the Slovakia men's national ice hockey team in the 1998 Winter Olympics.

Career statistics

Regular season and playoffs

International

External links

1972 births
Living people
Ässät players
Dresdner Eislöwen players
Frederikshavn White Hawks players
Füchse Duisburg players
Grand Rapids Griffins (IHL) players
HC Košice players
HC Neftekhimik Nizhnekamsk players
HC Oceláři Třinec players
HC Plzeň players
HC Vítkovice players
HK Poprad players
HK Spišská Nová Ves players
HKM Zvolen players
HV71 players
KLH Vajgar Jindřichův Hradec players
Motor České Budějovice players
Sportspeople from Spišská Nová Ves
Slovak ice hockey defencemen
Olympic ice hockey players of Slovakia
Ice hockey players at the 1998 Winter Olympics
Czechoslovak ice hockey defencemen
Expatriate ice hockey players in Italy
Expatriate ice hockey players in Denmark
Slovak expatriate ice hockey players in the United States
Slovak expatriate ice hockey players in the Czech Republic
Slovak expatriate ice hockey players in Germany
Slovak expatriate sportspeople in Denmark
Slovak expatriate sportspeople in Italy
Slovak expatriate ice hockey players in Sweden
Slovak expatriate ice hockey players in Finland
Slovak expatriate ice hockey players in Russia